Jan Smit may refer to:
Jan Smit (physicist) (born 1943), Dutch theoretical physicist
Jan Smit (singer) (born 1985), Dutch pop music and schlager singer
Jan Smit (footballer) (born 1983), Dutch footballer
Jan Smit (paleontologist) (born 1948), Dutch paleontologist
19140 Jansmit, asteroid named after the paleontologist

See also
Jan Smith, American music producer